The Deptford Poisoning Cases were a series of notorious murder cases that occurred in 1889 in Deptford, United Kingdom.

Investigators determined that at least three people were poisoned to death by Amelia Winters, possibly with the assistance of her daughter, Elizabeth Frost.  The two women insured over twenty people, five of whom died in questionable circumstances.   The victims included two young children who were relatives of Winters and Frost.

Winters died before going to trial. Frost was convicted of forgery for falsifying insurance documents and sent to prison for seven years..

The cases
The victims in the murder cases were Sidney Bolton, aged 11, the son of a niece living with Winters, William Sutton, the elderly father of another relative, and Elizabeth Frost, the mother-in-law of the daughter Elizabeth Frost. The doctor's certificate had given the cause of death as 'gastrodynia, diarrhoea and convulsions.' 

When Joseph Winters, Amellia's husband, discovered the insurance policies, he went to the police.  Investigators determined that Winters had insured the lives of 22 persons for a total of £240 with the Liverpool Victoria Friendly Society.  Five of these individuals had died by 1886, the society paying out for them. Winters also had 14 policies with the Prudential, which had also paid out for the same five deaths. 

There had been no checks on her relationships with the insured people. On the Liverpool Victoria's insurance form for Sidney Bolton she had just written 'X' against his mother's name.

The inquest

Mrs Winters' death
Winters died before she could be brought to trial.  However, she made a deathbed confession of guilt to her husband and daughter. No inquest was held for her death, the Doctor said it was the result of 'marasmus — a general wasting away.' 

Winters was buried in Brockley cemetery in Lewisham on 22 July 1889 in unconsecrated ground. The burial was kept secret with police present to deter demonstrations.

The Trial of Elizabeth Frost
Elizabeth Frost was initially indicted for murder, but the charges were dropped.  She was tried at the Old Bailey in July 1889 on charges of forging a document for the payment of money, with intent to defraud and was found guilty. Frost was sentenced to seven years' penal servitude.

Life insurance
The coroner for Surrey, Athelstan Braxton Hicks, had written a letter to The Times on 14 February 1889 listing eleven proposals for combating the dangers of child life insurance. The Deptford Poisoning Case was influential in tightening up the 1875 Friendly Societies Act.

Other victims
Investigators identified other possible poisoning victims of Winters.  No charges were brought in these case.

 Benjamin Winters, the brother of Joseph Winters,  Mrs Winters had insured him for 18 guineas. In 1885 he left Greenwich Workhouse to stay at the Winters' house for a holiday.  While there, Benjamin "was taken ill with diarrhaea, sickness, pains in the stomach, and similar symptoms to those described in the previous cases. Dr McNaughten attended the man, who expired in a few days in a fit." 

 William Winters, age five, Winters' grandson; she had insured him for £5. In the summer of 1886 William was brought from the hospital to stay with Winters.  William died in a few days later.

 Ann Bolton, an elderly woman insured by Winters for £3 10s. In November 1886 she died at Friendly Street, Deptford, after Winters had been nursing her.

A witness in the case, George Francis Dear, who had lodged with Winters, later committed suicide by hanging after finding out that Winters had insured his life with a Liverpool society for 19 guineas.

References

1889 murders in the United Kingdom
1880s murders in London
History of the London Borough of Lewisham
Murder in London
Serial murders in the United Kingdom